Seamus Thomas Harris O'Regan  (born January 18, 1971) is a Canadian politician who has been the federal minister of labour since October 26, 2021. A member of the Liberal Party, O'Regan was elected to the House of Commons in 2015, representing St. John's South—Mount Pearl. He has been in Cabinet since 2017, previously serving as minister of natural resources from 2019 to 2021, minister of Indigenous services in 2019, and minister of veterans affairs and associate minister of national defence from 2017 to 2019. Before he entered politics, O'Regan was a correspondent with CTV National News, and a host of Canada AM, which he co-hosted from 2003 to 2011 with Beverly Thomson.

Early life and education 
O'Regan was born in St. John's, Newfoundland, and spent 14 years growing up in Goose Bay, graduating from Goose High School. O'Regan is of half Irish descent. His father, also named Seamus O'Regan, was a judge of the Supreme Court of Newfoundland and Labrador. At the age of 10, O'Regan became a regional correspondent for CBC Radio's Anybody Home?, producing stories that celebrated the unique accomplishments of local residents, ranging from a professor hunting for giant squid to one woman's fight against leukemia.

He studied politics at St. Francis Xavier University in Antigonish, Nova Scotia, and at University College Dublin in Dublin, Ireland. He studied marketing strategies at INSEAD, an international business school near Paris, France. He received his Masters of Philosophy in Politics from the University of Cambridge, studying at Darwin College in Cambridge, England.

Career
He has worked as an assistant to Environment Minister Jean Charest in Ottawa and to Justice Minister Edward Roberts in St. John's, and was policy advisor and speechwriter to Premier Brian Tobin of Newfoundland and Labrador. In December 1999, O'Regan was named as one of Maclean's 100 Young Canadians to Watch in the 21st century.

In 2000, O'Regan joined talktv's current affairs program, the chatroom. He began his duties at Canada AM on December 19, 2001. On November 8, 2011, he announced that he would be leaving Canada AM on November 24, 2011, to become a correspondent for CTV National News. O'Regan left CTV in 2012. Since leaving CTV he has occasionally been a fill-in host on radio station CFRB in Toronto, ⁣ and worked on independent television productions and as a media innovator in residence at Ryerson University. O'Regan also served as the executive vice president for communications of the Stronach Group.

Political career
In September 2014, O'Regan was nominated as the Liberal Party candidate in the Newfoundland and Labrador riding of St. John's South—Mount Pearl for the 2015 federal election. On October 19, 2015, O'Regan won the election, defeating New Democrat incumbent Ryan Cleary. He was appointed to the cabinet on August 28, 2017, as the minister of veterans affairs and on January 14, 2019, was made the minister of Indigenous services, vacating his previous post.

He was re-elected in the 2019 federal election. Following the election, he was appointed minister of natural resources. He was re-elected again in the 2021 federal election.

Personal life
On July 9, 2010, O'Regan married his longtime partner, Steve Doussis, in Newfoundland.

O'Regan serves on the Boards of Katimavik, Canada's leading youth service-learning programme, and The Rooms, which houses the provincial art gallery, museum, and archives of Newfoundland and Labrador. He also sits on the board of directors for fellow Newfoundlander Allan Hawco's theatre company, The Company Theatre, located in Toronto.

In January 2016, O’Regan announced that he entered an alcoholism rehabilitation program.

In November 2017, he was hospitalized in Ottawa for a major gastrointestinal obstruction.

Shortly after the November 2020 death of his father Seamus Bernard O'Regan (1942–2020), Natural Resources Canada announcements began to give his name as Seamus O'Regan Jr.; previous announcements did not use the "Jr." suffix.

Electoral record

References

External links 

 Official Website
 Bio & mandate from the Prime Minister
 
 National Speakers Bureau biography
 

1971 births
Living people
Alumni of Darwin College, Cambridge
Alumni of University College Dublin
Canadian people of Irish descent
Canadian television reporters and correspondents
Members of the King's Privy Council for Canada
Members of the 29th Canadian Ministry
People from Happy Valley-Goose Bay
Politicians from St. John's, Newfoundland and Labrador
Speechwriters
St. Francis Xavier University alumni
Canadian LGBT journalists
Canadian LGBT broadcasters
Liberal Party of Canada MPs
Journalists from Newfoundland and Labrador
Members of the House of Commons of Canada from Newfoundland and Labrador
Canadian LGBT Members of Parliament
Canadian television hosts
CTV Television Network people
Gay politicians
21st-century Canadian politicians
21st-century Canadian LGBT people
Canadian gay men